Euphorbia ipecacuanhae, known by the common names of Carolina ipecac, American ipecac, and ipecac spurge, is a member of the spurge family, Euphorbiaceae. It is a perennial herb, native to the seaboard of the eastern United States, from South Carolina to Long Island.

Though it is not closely related to its namesake, Carapichea ipecacuanha, it was often used for the same purpose, with the deep taproot used to create a powerful emetic as a local substitute for imported syrup of ipecac.

References

External links

ipecacuanhae
Flora of South Carolina
Flora of North Carolina
Flora of Virginia
Flora of Maryland
Flora of Delaware
Flora of New Jersey
Flora of New York (state)